Princess Margaret of Connaught (Margaret Victoria Charlotte Augusta Norah; 15 January 1882 – 1 May 1920) was Crown Princess of Sweden as the first wife of the future King Gustaf VI Adolf. She was the elder daughter of Prince Arthur, Duke of Connaught, third son of Queen Victoria of the United Kingdom, and his wife Princess Louise Margaret of Prussia. Known in Sweden as Margareta, her marriage produced five children; she was the grandmother of King Carl XVI Gustaf of Sweden, Queen Margrethe II of Denmark and Queen Anne-Marie of Greece. She died 30 years before her husband's accession to the throne of Sweden.

Early life

Princess Margaret was born at Bagshot Park and baptised in the Private Chapel of Windsor Castle on 11 March 1882 by the Archbishop of Canterbury. Her godparents were Queen Victoria (her paternal grandmother); the German Emperor (her maternal great-granduncle, who was represented by the German Ambassador, Count Münster); the German Crown Princess (her paternal aunt, who was represented by her sister, Princess Christian of Schleswig-Holstein); Prince and Princess Friedrich Karl of Prussia (her maternal grandparents, for whom her paternal uncle the Duke of Edinburgh and aunt Princess Beatrice of the United Kingdom stood proxy); the Duchess of Cambridge (who was represented by Princess Louise, Duchess of Argyll); the Prince of Wales (her paternal uncle) and Prince Charles of Prussia (her great-grandfather, represented by Prince Leopold, Duke of Albany). She was known as "Daisy" to her family.

She was also confirmed in the Private Chapel of Windsor Castle in March 1898.

Princess Margaret grew up as a member of the British royal family, taking part in family holidays and weddings. She was a bridesmaid along with her sister at the wedding of their paternal cousins the Duke and Duchess of York on 6 July 1893.

Marriage

When Princess Margaret of Connaught was 23 and her younger sister Princess Patricia of Connaught was 18, both girls were among the most beautiful and eligible princesses in Europe. Their uncle, Edward VII, wanted his nieces to marry a European king or crown prince. In January 1905, the Duke and Duchess of Connaught visited Portugal, where they were received by King Carlos and his wife, Amélie of Orléans, whose sons Luís Filipe, Duke of Braganza and Prince Manuel entertained the young British princesses. The Portuguese expected one of the Connaught princesses would become the future Queen of Portugal.

The Connaughts continued their trip to Egypt and Sudan. In Cairo, they met Prince Gustaf Adolf of Sweden, the future Gustaf VI Adolf of Sweden, grandson of the Swedish King Oscar II. Originally, Margaret's sister Patricia had been considered a suitable match for Gustaf Adolf; without his knowledge, a meeting was arranged with the two sisters. Gustaf Adolf and Margaret fell in love at first sight; he proposed at a dinner held by Lord Cromer at the British Consulate in Egypt and was accepted. Margaret's parents were very happy with the match.  

Gustaf Adolf and Margaret married on 15 June 1905 in St. George's Chapel at Windsor Castle.  Margaret's bridesmaids were her sister Princess Patricia of Connaught, cousins Princess Beatrice of Saxe-Coburg and Gotha and Princess Victoria Eugenie of Battenberg, and first cousin once removed Princess Mary of Wales.  The couple spent their honeymoon at Adare Manor in County Limerick, Ireland, and arrived in Sweden on 8 July 1905.

One of Margaret's wedding presents was the Connaught tiara, which remains in the Swedish royal jewellery collection today.

The couple had five children: 
 Prince Gustaf Adolf, Duke of Västerbotten, who predeceased his father: his son became King Carl XVI Gustaf
 Sigvard Bernadotte, Count of Wisborg
 Ingrid, Queen of Denmark
 Prince Bertil, Duke of Halland
 Carl Johan Bernadotte, Count of Wisborg

Margaret was a dedicated mother to her children, and was determined to spend time with them. She was not keen on letting them be raised by nursery staff, as was the convention of the day.

When Gustaf Adolf's father, Crown Prince Gustaf, acceded to the throne as King Gustaf V in 1907, the couple became Crown Prince and Princess of Sweden.

Crown Princess

The marriage between Margaret and Gustaf Adolf is described as a happy love match. Gustaf Adolf felt great pressure from the "Prussian" military discipline with which he had been raised by his mother, and he was greatly affected by and attracted to Margaret's differing English customs. The visiting Infanta Eulalia of Spain wrote that the Crown Princess gave the Swedish court "just a touch of the elegance of the Court of St James's" and of how much Margaret loved her life in Sweden.

After her arrival in Sweden, Margaret, who in Sweden was called "Margareta", received lessons in the Swedish language, and asked to be educated in Swedish history and social welfare. After two years, she spoke good Swedish. She was also eager to find out more about Sweden, and on many occasions went on incognito trips. During her first years in Sweden, Margaret behaved with great seriousness and was therefore regarded as stiff, but the view of her changed because of her great interest in sports, where she showed a more relaxed and natural manner. Margaret took a great interest in many forms of sports; she used the winters for skiing, ice skating and playing hockey (what is nowadays called bandy), and played tennis and golf during the summers. She also corresponded with various relatives.

Margaret was also interested in art, and was an admirer of the works of Claude Monet. She photographed, painted, and took a great interest in gardening. She and her spouse received Sofiero Palace as a wedding gift, and they spent their summers there and made a great effort creating gardens in an English style on the estate; her children participated in their improvement. In 1915, Margaret as Kronprinsessan Margareta published the book Vår trädgård på Sofiero ("Our Garden at Sofiero") and two years later also Från blomstergården ("From the Flower Garden") illustrated with her own drawings and photographs, which were sold for the benefit of household schools with childcare.

During World War I, Margaret created a sewing society in Sweden to support the Red Cross. The society was called Kronprinsessans Centralförråd för landstormsmäns beklädnad och utrustning ("The Crown Princess's central storage for clothing and equipment of the home guard"), which was to equip the Swedish armed forces with suitable underwear. When paraffin supplies ran low she organized a candle collection, and in November 1917 she instituted a scheme to train girls to work on the land. She also acted as intermediary for relatives separated by the war. With her help, private letters and requests to trace men missing in action were passed on. She was also active in her work on behalf of prisoners. She aided prisoners of war in camps around Europe, especially British nationals. Margaret's efforts during the war were pro-British, in contrast to her mother-in-law's strictly pro-German attitude. In 1917, Margaret organized Margaretainsamlingen för de fattiga ("The Margaret fundraiser for the poor"). At the end of the war, when the final steps towards full democracy were taken in Sweden, Margaret's positive attitude to reform influenced her husband the Crown Prince. Unlike the attitude of her reform-hostile in-laws, King Gustaf and Queen Victoria, this is believed to have eased political tensions and preserved the Swedish monarchy.

Death

At 2 o'clock in the morning on Saturday, 1 May 1920, her father's 70th birthday, Crown Princess Margaret died suddenly in Stockholm of "blood poisoning" (sepsis). Some time before this she had suffered from measles, which aggravated her ear, and she underwent surgery to remove a mastoid. Since the previous Sunday, she had been suffering from pain in her face from something below her eye, and doctors decided to perform another procedure. On Thursday, symptoms of erysipelas appeared under her right ear. She fell gravely ill on Friday night when symptoms of sepsis became evident, and she died within hours. At the time, she was eight months pregnant with her sixth child. In announcing her death during traditional International Workers' Day celebrations, Swedish Prime Minister Hjalmar Branting said: "the ray of sunshine at Stockholm Palace has gone out" (Solstrålen på Stockholms slott har slocknat).

In Britain, there had been reports that Margaret was unhappy in Sweden and there were dubious rumours at her death that it actually had been a suicide.

Princess Margaret was buried according to her specific and detailed wishes, written in 1914. She asked to be buried in her wedding dress and her veil, with a crucifix in her hands, in a simple coffin made from English oak and covered in British and Swedish flags. She requested that there should be no lying-in-state after her death.

Legacy

In 2021, an exhibition Daisy. Crown Princess Margareta, 1882–1920 opened at the Royal Palace in Stockholm.

Honours and arms

Honours
 Member, Second Class, of the Royal Order of Victoria and Albert (VA)
 Companion of the Imperial Order of the Crown of India (CI)
 25 July 1905: Lady of Justice of the Order of the Hospital of St. John of Jerusalem (DStJ)

Arms
Upon her marriage in 1905, Princess Margaret adopted the arms of a Princess of Sweden and Duchess of Scania, with an inescutcheon of her previous arms: the arms of the United Kingdom, with an inescutcheon of Saxony, the whole differenced by a label argent of five points, the first and fifth bearing fleurs-de-lys azure, the second and fourth shamrocks vert, and the central point a cross gules. The inescutcheon of Saxony was removed by King George V in 1917.

Issue

Ancestry

References

Further reading 
  

1882 births
1920 deaths
British princesses
Daughters of British dukes
Margaret 1905
Crown Princesses of Sweden
House of Saxe-Coburg and Gotha (United Kingdom)
Burials at Kungliga begravningsplatsen
Companions of the Order of the Star of India
Dames of Justice of the Order of St John
Ladies of the Royal Order of Victoria and Albert
People from Bagshot
British emigrants to Sweden
British expatriates in Sweden
Royal reburials